Giblin is a surname. Notable people with the surname include:

 Anne E. Giblin, marine biologist
 :fr:Béatrice Giblin (born 1947), French scholar
 Belinda Giblin (born 1950), Australian actress
 Edmund Giblin (1923–2000), English footballer
 Irene M. Giblin (1888–1974), American ragtime musician
 John Giblin, British double bassist and bass guitarist
 Lyndhurst Giblin (1872–1951), Australian statistician and economist 
 Paul Giblin, American investigative journalist
 Peter Giblin (born 1943), English mathematician
 Ronald Worthy Giblin (1863–1936), Australian surveyor and historian
 Thomas P. Giblin (born 1947), US Democratic Party politician 
 Vincent Giblin (1817–1884), Australian cricket player and banker
 William Giblin (1840–1887), Premier of Tasmania, Australia

See also
 Giblin family pioneering family of Hobart, Tasmania, Australia
 Giblin, Illinois, unincorporated community in Champaign County, Illinois, US
 7728 Giblin, asteroid.